Neoscapteriscus borellii, the southern mole cricket, is a species of mole cricket in the family Gryllotalpidae.

References

 Capinera J.L, Scott R.D., Walker T.J. (2004). Field Guide to Grasshoppers, Katydids, and Crickets of the United States. Cornell University Press.

Further reading

 

Gryllotalpidae
Insects described in 1894